Semantics is a textbook on semantics by John Saeed. The book was first published in 1997 with the second edition published in 2003, third edition in 2009 and fourth edition in 2015.

Reception
The book was reviewed by Barbara Abbott and Lynn Burley. Burley calls it "a standout among introductory textbooks" and believes that a special advantage of the book is the examination of languages other than English in such subjects as deixis and Thematic relations.

References

External links
Semantics
Books in semantics
Linguistics textbooks
Wiley (publisher) books
1997 non-fiction books